Pacific Ocean Blue is the only studio album by American musician Dennis Wilson, co-founder of the Beach Boys. When released in August 1977, it was warmly received critically, and noted for outselling the Beach Boys' contemporary efforts. Two singles were issued from the album, "River Song" and "You and I", which did not chart.

The album remains a focal point of Wilson's legacy, being referred to as a "classic". It was voted number 838 in Colin Larkin's All Time Top 1000 Albums. Wilson intended to record a follow-up, entitled Bambu, but the album was left unfinished at the time of his death in December 1983.

Background and recording
After several attempts, starting in 1970, to realize his own project, some of which made it to the finished album, Wilson recorded the bulk of Pacific Ocean Blue in the months spanning the fall of 1976 to the following spring, at the Beach Boys' own Brother Studios.  At the time of recording, Dennis' hard living had begun affecting his looks and more importantly his singing voice, which now delivered grainy and rough, yet still deeply soulful, vocals.

Recalling the time Wilson spent working on the album, co-producer Gregg Jakobson said, "This was when he fully accepted himself as an artist. Brian had shown him chords on the piano, but as he'd become more proficient the music that came forth was not derivative of that. Having his own studio helped tremendously. With a little encouragement, and the right tools, Dennis took off."

Reception

Released in August 1977, Pacific Ocean Blue received mixed reviews upon release, but in subsequent years has been re-evaluated by critics and is now widely praised. It has appeared on several "Best-of" lists including Robert Dimery's "1001 Albums You Must Hear Before You Die," and Mojo's "Lost Albums You Must Own" and "70 of the Greatest Albums of the 70s" lists. In 2005, it was ranked No. 18 in GQ's "The 100 Coolest Albums in the World Right Now!" list. He did occasionally perform his solo material on the 1977 Beach Boys tour. Pacific Ocean Blue later developed a status as a cult item. In December 2018, under the name Chewing, Nik Ewing of Local Natives along with Cults, Nico Segal and Pop Etc covered Dennis Wilson's album in its entirety.

At the time of its initial release, the album didn't do well commercially: Despite a significant promotional campaign, the album peaked at No. 96 during a short 12-week Billboard chart run. The disappointing performance of the record, combined with Wilson's increasingly unreliable professional behavior, led his record label to pull support for a modest West Coast tour that had been scheduled to promote the album.

In a 1977 interview, Brian reported that his reaction when Dennis played him early mixes of the album was "Dennis, that's funky! That's funky!" Dennis remembered,

In a 2008 interview, Brian said that he had never heard the album. He clarified in his 2016 memoir:

Release history
Issued by Caribou/CBS Records on CD in 1991, Pacific Ocean Blue went out of print within a year due to ongoing disagreements over copyright ownership; the album was virtually unavailable for more than fifteen years. Copies of the extremely rare 1991 CD sold for over $200.

Legacy Recordings released a special 30th anniversary, 2-disc edition of Pacific Ocean Blue on June 17, 2008. It includes material from the Bambu sessions. A limited edition 180-gram vinyl multi-LP box set was also released on the Sundazed label.

Notable on the reissue is the inclusion of the song "Holy Man", recorded for Pacific Ocean Blue in 1977, in two versions.  Wilson had completed work on the instrumental backing track but never finished a satisfactory vocal, erasing an original attempt.  For the reissue, Taylor Hawkins of the Foo Fighters was recruited to record a vocal version in Wilson's style given their similarities. The song's original lyricist, Gregg Jakobson, was tapped to help recall the song's original melody and to write lyrics for the song. Queen guitarist Brian May and drummer Roger Taylor also recorded backing vocals for the track, along with guitar by May, although their contributions went unused until the version featuring them was released as part of Record Store Day 2019.

Despite missing the UK Album Chart on its original 1977 release, the expanded reissue of Pacific Ocean Blue entered the UK album chart at No. 16, also reaching No. 5 on the Norway album chart.  In addition, the package managed to reach No. 8 on Billboard's Top Pop Catalog Albums chart.

Track listing

30th Anniversary Edition

Personnel

Per Craig Slownski

References

External links
 Official Site (2008 reissue)
 
 Buddyhead's review/interview of "POB/Bambu" reissue

Dennis Wilson albums
1977 debut albums
Caribou Records albums
Albums produced by Dennis Wilson
Albums produced by Gregg Jakobson
CBS Records albums
Legacy Recordings albums
Sundazed Records albums